Fitzgerald is a rural locality in the local government area (LGA) of Derwent Valley in the South-east LGA region of Tasmania. The 2016 census recorded a population of 38 for the state suburb of Fitzgerald.

History 
Fitzgerald was gazetted as a locality in 1959.

Geography
The Tyenna River forms the north-western boundary.

Road infrastructure 
Route B61 (Gordon River Road) runs through from north-east to north-west.

References

Towns in Tasmania
Localities of Derwent Valley Council